Numidotheriidae is an extinct family of primitive proboscidean that lived from the late Paleocene to the early Oligocene periods of North Africa.

Fragmentary fossils (mainly teeth) of the early Eocene genera, Daouitherium and Phosphatherium, have been found in the Ouled Abdun Basin, Morocco. Numidotherium is known from an almost complete skeleton from late early Eocene deposits in southern Algeria and Libya. Compared to modern elephants, the Numidotheriidae were quite small. Phosphatherium, for instance, was only 60 cm long and weighed about 15 kg. Numidotherium was about 1 m in length. They occupied a similar ecological niche to the modern hippopotamus and the related early proboscid Moeritherium, feeding on soft, aquatic plants in marshy environments. The Numidotheriidae are not believed to be direct ancestors of modern elephants, but a collateral branch.

References 

Eocene proboscideans
Prehistoric mammal families
Paleocene first appearances
Eocene extinctions